Frances Forbes-Robertson (after marriage, Frances Harrod; 1866 – 23 May 1956) was a British artist, novelist, and actor. Among her publications can be counted The Devil's Pronoun (1894), Odd Stories (1897), The Potentate (1898), Mother Earth (1902), The Hidden Model (1902), What We Dream (1903),  Trespass (1928), and Stained Wings (1930).

Biography
Frances Mary Desirée Forbes-Robertson was born in 1866. She was the youngest child of John Forbes-Robertson, a theatre critic and journalist from Aberdeen, and his wife Frances. The eldest of the eleven children in the family was Johnston Forbes-Robertson, the actor. Two other brothers, Ian Forbes-Robertson (1859–1936), and Norman Forbes-Robertson (1858–1932) also became actors, and a third, Eric Forbes-Robertson (1865–1935) became a painter. She was the sister-in-law of the actress Maxine Elliott, and the great-aunt of actress Meriel Forbes (granddaughter of her brother Norman), who married actor Ralph Richardson. Forbes-Robertson was educated in convents in France and Italy. 

She married Henry Dawes Harrod, F.S.A.  in 1900, and was the mother of Roy Harrod, the economist.

Forbes-Robertson (known also by her married surname, Harrod) was the author of The Potentate, Mother Earth, The Hidden Model, Odd Stories, The Devil's Pronoun, What We Dream, Taming of the Ponte, Trespass and Stained Wings. She also published other works of fiction, such as those contributed to the Times Literary Supplement, Westminster Gazette, and The Pall Mall Magazine. 

She died in London, 23 May 1956.

Selected works

As Frances Forbes-Robertson
 The Devil's Pronoun, 1894
 Odd Stories, 1897
 The Potentate, 1898

As Frances Harrod
 Mother Earth, 1902
 The Hidden Model, 1902
 What We Dream, 1903
 Trespass, 1928
 Stained Wings, 1930

References

Attribution

Bibliography

External links
 
 Review of The Potentate in The Sketch, vol. 22, June 15, 1898

1866 births
1956 deaths
19th-century British novelists
19th-century British short story writers
20th-century British novelists
20th-century British short story writers
19th-century British women writers
19th-century British writers
20th-century British women writers